Sumuel or Sumu-El (su-mu-el3) ruled the ancient Near East city-state
of Larsa from c. 1894 BC to 1866 BC (middle chronology). He was an Amorite.

Annals for his complete 29-year reign have survived; thus it is known that he campaigned against Akusum and Kazallu in his year 4, Uruk in year 5, Pinaratim in year 8, Sabum in year 10, Kish in year 11, Kazallu in year 15, Nanna-Isha in 16, and Umma at the end of his reign. Most of these seem to be names of small villages along the Euphrates.

Sumuel is known from several inscriptions.

See also

Chronology of the ancient Near East

Notes

External links
Sumuel Year Names at CDLI

Amorite kings
19th-century BC Sumerian kings
Kings of Larsa
19th-century BC people